"As Good as I Once Was" is a song co-written and recorded by American country music singer Toby Keith that reached the top of the Billboard Hot Country Songs chart. This song and his 2003 single "Beer for My Horses" are both his longest-running number one hits, each having spent six weeks at number one. "As Good as I Once Was" was released in May 2005 as the second single from Keith's album Honkytonk University. Keith wrote the song with Scotty Emerick.

The song was named BMI's Song of the Year for 2006. It has since become one of Keith's signature songs, as well as one of his most successful.

Content
The narrator, a man approaching or in middle age and apparently sitting in a bar, is put into situations that test his masculinity. Having outlived his glory days, he insists he now is no longer "as good as (he) once was" in his younger days, but although he no longer has the stamina to do what he used to do all the time, he can still be "as good, once, as (he) ever was." Examples given include a set of twins who want to draw him into a threesome and a fight against two rednecks and a "big fat biker man" to bail his buddy, Dave, out of a botched pool hustle.

Music video
The music video was directed by Michael Salomon and premiered on CMT on May 16, 2005. It follows the narrative of the song and features Annie Sorrell and Alicia Loren as the frisky twins. At the beginning of the video, Keith is sat at the bar where he meets Bobbie Jo who invites him "for a rodeo" with her twin sister Betty Lou. Then, in another bar, Keith's best friend Dave gets into a fight with a "couple of redneck boys", the beer starts sloshing, causing the music to fail, Keith yells in slow motion before the chorus resumes. As he goes to help Dave, Keith gets punched in the face by a tall bouncer. In the next shot, Keith was in an ambulance with a broken nose, as well as an intravenous drip. At the end of video, the ambulance drives off into the night.

Critical reception
Matt Bjorke writing for About.com stated "the song is a good one, so good that it rivals anything off of Toby's "How Do You Like Me Now?!" album. It's a fun track about getting older, and how we don't have as much "energy" as we once had." Sputnik Music called it "a testament to how much old age sucks" while Allmusic declared the song was "wonderfully self-depreciating".

Chart performance
"As Good as I Once Was" debuted at number 37 on the U.S. Billboard Hot Country Singles & Tracks for the week of May 21, 2005.

Year-end charts

References

2005 singles
2005 songs
Toby Keith songs
Songs about old age
Songs written by Scotty Emerick
Songs written by Toby Keith
Song recordings produced by James Stroud
DreamWorks Records singles
Music videos directed by Michael Salomon